Bradley Alan Thain (born 23 March 1997) is a South African rugby union player for the  in Super Rugby, the  in the Currie Cup and the  in the Rugby Challenge. His regular position is scrum-half.

References

External links
 itsrugby.co.uk profile

South African rugby union players
Living people
1997 births
Rugby union scrum-halves
Golden Lions players
Peñarol Rugby players
Lions (United Rugby Championship) players
Tel Aviv Heat players
South African expatriate sportspeople in Israel
South African expatriate rugby union players
Expatriate rugby union players in Israel